Mario Maloča (born 4 May 1989) is a Croatian professional footballer who plays as a centre-back for Lechia Gdańsk.

Club career
Maloča spent most of his youth career at Dinamo Zagreb and had spells with youth teams at NK Zagreb, Inter Zaprešić and Kamen Ingrad. In 2007, Maloča signed for Hajduk Split.

He made his Prva HNL debut with Hajduk at the age of 18 against Šibenik in the 2007–08 season and soon became a first team regular, playing alongside renowned defenders such as Igor Tudor, Goran Sablić and Boris Živković. After the season ended he signed a five-year contract with Hajduk, binding him to Poljud until 2013. In April 2015, he was dropped to B team for a short time, and in July 2015 he left Hajduk.

In July 2017, Maloča joined 2. Bundesliga side SpVgg Greuther Fürth on loan for the 2017–18 season.

In May 2019 it was confirmed, that he had joined Lechia Gdańsk on a 3-year contract.

International career
Maloča also earned 13 caps for Croatia's U-19 and U-21 teams and took part in Croatia's 2008 Under-19 European Championship campaign where he scored a goal against Albania. In August 2012, he was called to the Croatia national football team by Croatian manager Igor Štimac. He debuted in a friendly match against Switzerland, where he started and was substituted by Ante Vukušić at the start of the second half.

Career statistics

Personal life
Despite being born in Zagreb and part of Dinamo Zagreb youth team in his early years, Maloča opted to play for Hajduk Split. Maloča married his childhood sweetheart Ivana in June 2012. The couple had their first child, Tea, on 21 March 2013.

Honours
Hajduk Split
Croatian Cup: 2009–10, 2012–13

Lechia Gdańsk
Polish Super Cup: 2019

References

External links
 

Mario Maloča at Sportnet.hr 

1989 births
Living people
Footballers from Zagreb
Association football central defenders
Croatian footballers
Croatia youth international footballers
Croatia under-21 international footballers
Croatia international footballers
HNK Hajduk Split players
Lechia Gdańsk players
SpVgg Greuther Fürth players
Croatian Football League players
Ekstraklasa players
2. Bundesliga players
Croatian expatriate footballers
Expatriate footballers in Poland
Croatian expatriate sportspeople in Poland
Expatriate footballers in Germany
Croatian expatriate sportspeople in Germany